Emad El-Din Hassan (born 19 November 1963) is an Egyptian former judoka. He competed in the men's extra-lightweight event at the 1988 Summer Olympics.

References

External links
 

1963 births
Living people
Egyptian male judoka
Olympic judoka of Egypt
Judoka at the 1988 Summer Olympics
Place of birth missing (living people)
20th-century Egyptian people
21st-century Egyptian people